Boilesk is a 1933 Fleischer Studios Screen Songs animated short film starring the "Watson Sisters".

Synopsis
Risque goings-on during an afternoon at a broken-down Burlesque variety show. The show also includes a live-action comedy which features the Watson Sisters who perform 'I'm Playing With Fire' followed with the Bouncing Ball.

External links

Boilesk at the Cartoon Database

1930s American animated films
American black-and-white films
1933 animated films
1933 short films
Paramount Pictures short films
Fleischer Studios short films
Short films directed by Dave Fleischer
1930s animated short films
1930s English-language films
American animated short films
Sing-along
Films set in a theatre
American erotic films